Brian Paul Engblom (born January 27, 1955) is a Canadian ice hockey broadcaster for the Tampa Bay Lightning, and a former professional hockey defenseman. He was a three-time Stanley Cup winner with the Montreal Canadiens.

Biography
Engblom was born in Winnipeg, Manitoba, and played for the University of Wisconsin–Madison. He was drafted 22nd overall by the Montreal Canadiens in the 1975 NHL Entry Draft. He played his first two professional seasons with Montreal's AHL affiliate Nova Scotia Voyageurs before playing in his first NHL game in the 1977 Stanley Cup playoffs with Montreal. He won two Stanley Cups, in 1978, and 1979 with the Canadiens. Engblom's name was left off the Cup in 1977 because he played no regular season games. He played in two playoff games and did not play in the finals.

In September 1982, while he was establishing himself as a top NHL defenseman, Engblom was traded to the Washington Capitals as part of a six-player blockbuster trade that sent him, Doug Jarvis, Rod Langway and Craig Laughlin to Washington in exchange for Rick Green and Ryan Walter. A season later, he was dealt with Ken Houston to the Los Angeles Kings in exchange for future Hall Of Famer Larry Murphy. He finished his career with stints for the Buffalo Sabres, and Calgary Flames.  Engblom's final NHL season of 1986–87 ended prematurely due to bone spurs in his spinal column that required major surgery to repair. In 11 seasons, Engblom scored 29 goals and 177 assists.

Broadcasting career
Engblom was an NHL studio analyst and color commentator for ESPN and NHL on ABC from 1993 to 2004, and also worked for NBC after they acquired NHL TV rights in 2004. During the 2005-06 season, he was color analyst for Columbus Blue Jackets games aired on Fox Sports Ohio. Currently, he works as a color analyst for the Tampa Bay Lightning on Sun Sports, and NHL telecasts for the NBC Sports Network. Engblom has also provided post-game analysis for the Colorado Avalanche on Altitude Sports and Entertainment, in rotation with Mark Rycroft.

Engblom joined the Tampa Bay Lightning for the 2015-16 season as color analyst alongside Rick Peckham, and later with Dave Randorf, replacing Bobby Taylor, who moved to studio host.

Awards and honours

NHL plus-minus leader (+63) (1981)
"Honoured Member" of the Manitoba Hockey Hall of Fame

Career statistics

Regular season and playoffs

International

References

External links

Profile at hockeydraftcentral.com

1955 births
Living people
AHCA Division I men's ice hockey All-Americans
Buffalo Sabres players
Calgary Flames players
Canadian ice hockey defencemen
Canadian people of Swedish descent
Colorado Avalanche announcers
Los Angeles Kings players
Montreal Canadiens draft picks
Montreal Canadiens players
National Hockey League broadcasters
Nova Scotia Voyageurs players
Ice hockey people from Winnipeg
Stanley Cup champions
Washington Capitals players
Winnipeg Jets (WHA) draft picks
Winnipeg Jets announcers
Winnipeg Monarchs players
Wisconsin Badgers men's ice hockey players